Greenwich is an unincorporated community and census-designated place (CDP) in Cumberland County, in the U.S. state of New Jersey.

Greenwich was first listed as a CDP prior to the 2020 census. The area along both sides of Ye Greate Street, the main street in the community, comprises the Greenwich Historic District, listed on the National Register of Historic Places. The district continues north to the community of Othello.

Demographics
As of the 2020 United States census, the population was 251.

References 

Census-designated places in Cumberland County, New Jersey
Census-designated places in New Jersey
Greenwich Township, Cumberland County, New Jersey